Mikhail Grigoroevich Akimov (1847–1915) was a Russian politician. After graduating from the University of Moscow, he entered the Ministry of Justice. He served as an Assistant Public Prosecutor in Kiev in 1881. It is known that he was on the roster of Senators in December 1905, because the Chairman of the Council of Ministers, Sergei Witte, chose him to be the successor of Sergey Manukhin from that list. He served as Minister of Justice in the Witte government for the remainder of Witte's tenure (April 1906). He was appointed to the Imperial State Council in 1906. He was eventually chosen as the Chairman of the Imperial State Council.

References
 Out of My Past: The Memoirs of Count Kokovtsov Edited by H.H. Fisher and translated by Laura Matveev; Stanford University Press, 1935.
 The Memoirs of Count Witte Edited and translated by Sydney Harcave; Sharpe Press, 1990.

Bibliography
 

Politicians of the Russian Empire
1847 births
1915 deaths
Russian monarchists
Justice ministers of Russia
Imperial Moscow University alumni